Alfonso Scalzone (born 11 June 1996) is an Italian rower.

Career
He is the nephew of Angelo Scalzone, Olympic champion in shooting, mixed trap at the 1972 Summer Olympics.

He competes for the Canottieri Savoia of Naples.

He started competition with Giuseppe Di Mare with he won the gold medal at the World Championships in Plovdiv.

At the 2018 World Rowing Championships, in Plovdiv, still with Giuseppe Di Mare, he won the gold medal.

At the 2019 European Rowing Championships in Lucerne, he won the silves medal with teammates Catello Amarante II, Lorenzo Fontana and Gabriel Soares.

References

External links

1996 births
Living people
Italian male rowers
World Rowing Championships medalists for Italy